Emergency escape can refer to:
Fire escapes in buildings
Emergency exits in vehicles